The Carleton and York Regiment was an infantry regiment of the Non-Permanent Active Militia of the Canadian Militia (now the Canadian Army). In 1954, the regiment was amalgamated with The New Brunswick Scottish and The North Shore (New Brunswick) Regiment to form the two battalions of The New Brunswick Regiment (later renamed as The Royal New Brunswick Regiment).

Lineage

The Carleton and York Regiment 

 Originated on 10 September 1869, in Woodstock, New Brunswick, as The Carleton Light Infantry.
 Redesignated on 5 November 1869, as the 67th The Carleton Light Infantry.
 Redesignated on 8 May 1900, as the 67th Regiment Carleton Light Infantry.
 Redesignated on 15 March 1920, as The Carleton Light Infantry.
 Amalgamated on 15 December 1936, with The York Regiment and redesignated as The Carleton and York Regiment.
 Redesignated on 7 November 1940, as the 2nd (Reserve) Battalion, The Carleton and York Regiment.
 Redesignated on 1 November 1945, as The Carleton and York Regiment.
 Amalgamated on 31 October 1954, with The New Brunswick Scottish and redesignated as the 1st Battalion, The New Brunswick Regiment (Carleton and York).
 Redesignated on 18 May 1956, as The Royal New Brunswick Regiment.

The York Regiment 

 Originated on 10 September 1869, in Fredericton, New Brunswick, as The York Provisional Volunteer Battalion.
 Redesignated on 12 November 1869, as the 71st York Volunteer Battalion.
 Redesignated on 8 May 1900, as the 71st York Regiment.
 Redesignated on 15 March 1920, as The York Regiment.
 Amalgamated on 15 December 1936, with The Carleton Light Infantry.

Perpetuations 

 12th Battalion, CEF
 104th Battalion, CEF
 140th Battalion (St. John's Tigers), CEF

History

Formation 
As a result of the 1936 Canadian Militia reorganization, The Carleton and York Regiment was formed in St. Stephen by the amalgamation of The Carleton Light Infantry and The York Regiment.

Second World War

Europe 
On 1 September 1939, The Carleton and York Regiment mobilized The Carleton and York Regiment, CASF for active service. The battalion was later on 7 November 1940, redesignated as the 1st Battalion, The Carleton and York Regiment, CASF and on 9 December 1939, the battalion Embarked for Great Britain as part of the 1st Canadian Infantry Brigade, 1st Canadian Infantry Division.

After serving in the UK on anti-invasion duties, on 10 July 1943, the battalion landed in Sicily as part of Operation Husky where it fought for 38 days. The battalion would then on 3 September 1943, take part in the invasion of Italy and would serve with the rest of the I Canadian Corps in the Italian Campaign.

On 16 March 1945, the battalion along with the rest of the I Canadian Corps moved to North-West Europe as part of Operation Goldflake, and where upon arrival, the battalion fought until the end of the war.

On 30 September 1945, the overseas battalion of The Carleton and York Regiment was disbanded.

Pacific 
On 1 June 1945, a second CASF component of the regiment was mobilized for service in the Pacific theatre of operations with the re-raised 6th Canadian Infantry Division (Canadian Army Pacific Force) for service as part of the proposed Commonwealth Corps for the planned Invasion of Japan. This unit was designated as the 2nd Canadian Infantry Battalion, (The Carleton and York Regiment), CASF. On 1 November 1945, the battalion was disbanded.

Post War 
On 4 May 1951, The Carleton and York Regiment mobilized two temporary Active Force / Regular Force companies designated "E" and "F" Companies respectively.

"E" Company was reduced to nil strength upon its personnel being incorporated into the 1st Canadian Infantry Battalion (later the 3rd Battalion, The Canadian Guards) for service in Germany with the North Atlantic Treaty Organization as part of the 27th Canadian Infantry Brigade. On 29 July 1953, the company was disbanded.

"F" Company was initially used as a reinforcement pool for "E" Company. On 15 May 1952, the company was reduced to nil strength, upon its personnel being absorbed by the newly formed 2nd Canadian Infantry Battalion (later the 4th Battalion, The Canadian Guards) for service in Korea with the United Nations as part of the 25th Canadian Infantry Brigade. On 29 July 1953, the company was disbanded.

Amalgamation 
As a result of the Kennedy Report on the Reserve Army, on 31 October 1954, The Carleton and York Regiment was amalgamated along with The New Brunswick Scottish and The North Shore (New Brunswick) Regiment to form The New Brunswick Regiment (later redesignated as The Royal New Brunswick Regiment). The Carleton and York Regiment along with The New Brunswick Scottish would form the 1st Battalion, The New Brunswick Regiment (Carleton and York) and The North Shore (New Brunswick) Regiment would form the 2nd Battalion, The New Brunswick Regiment (North Shore) from 1954 until 2012 when it was reorganized once again as a separate infantry regiment.

Organization

The Carleton and York Regiment (15 December 1936) 

 Regimental Headquarters (St. Stephen, New Brunswick) 
 HQ Company (Woodstock, NB) 
 A Company (Fredericton, NB)
 B Company (Woodstock, NB)
 C Company (St. Stephen, NB)
 D Company (Edmundston, NB)

Alliances 

  - The East Yorkshire Regiment (The Duke of York's Own) (1936-1954)
  - The Queen's Own Royal West Kent Regiment (1936-1954)

Battle honours

South African War 

 South Africa, 1900

The Great War 

 Ypres, 1915, '17
 Festubert, 1915
 Mount Sorrel
 Somme, 1916, ‘18
 Ancre Heights
 Ancre, 1916
 Arras, 1917, ‘18
 Vimy, 1917
 Hill 70
 Passchendaele
 Amiens
 Scarpe, 1918
 Drocourt-Quéant
 Hindenburg Line
 Canal du Nord
 Valenciennes
 France and Flanders, 1916-18

The Second World War 

 Landing in Sicily
 Valguarnera
 Sicily, 1943
 Landing at Reggio
 Gambatesa
 The Sangro
 The Gully
 Point 59
 Cassino II
 Gustav Line
 Liri Valley
 Hitler Line
 Melfa Crossing
 Gothic Line
 Lamone Crossing
 Rimini Line
 San Fortunato
 Naviglio Canal
 Italy, 1943–1945
 Apeldoorn
 North-West Europe, 1945

Notable members 

 Major-General Hardy N. Ganong 
 Major Rowland Frazee,

References 

Carleton and York Regiment
Royal New Brunswick Regiment
Former infantry regiments of Canada
Military units and formations of New Brunswick
Military units and formations of Canada in World War II
Infantry regiments of Canada in World War II